USS Gull is a name used more than once by the U.S. Navy:

 , was a fleet minesweeper commissioned 3 December 1940
 , was a minesweeper commissioned 28 February 1944
 Gull (AM-399), was to be built by the Defoe Shipbuilding Company in Bay City, Michigan, but the construction contract was canceled by the US Navy on 16 May 1945

United States Navy ship names